Earths were defined by the Ancient Greeks as "materials that could not be changed further by the sources of heat then available". Several oxides were thought to be earths, such as aluminum oxide and magnesium oxide. It wasn't discovered until 1808 that these weren't elements but metallic oxides.

See also 
 Rare earth metals
 Alkaline earth metals

References

Inorganic chemistry